Jacqueline Laurent (6 August 1918 – 18 December 2009) was a French film actress. She starred with Jean Gabin in Marcel Carné's Le jour se lève (1939).

Early years
Laurent was the daughter of Jacques Janin, a composer whose compositions included music for films.

Film
After seeing one of Laurent's French films, Louis B. Mayer suggested that she try acting in Hollywood. That suggestion led to her American film debut in Judge Hardy's Children (1938).

Personal life
Laurent was married when she was 16 and divorced soon after.

Selected filmography
 Dawn Over France (1935)
 Sarati the Terrible (1937)
 Judge Hardy's Children (1938)
 Le Jour Se Lève (1939)
 Farewell Love! (1943)
 Two Timid Souls (1943)
 L'abito nero da sposa (1945)
 The Ways of Sin (1946)

References

External links

1918 births
2009 deaths
French film actresses
People from Aube
20th-century French actresses